Rear Admiral Bruce Kafer,  (born 1959) is a senior Royal Australian Navy officer and former Commandant of the Australian Defence Force Academy, a position he held from December 2009 until December 2013. Kafer served as the Director-General of the Australian Navy Cadets and Reserves from December 2014 to December 2016, when he was appointed Head of the Cadet, Reserve and Employer Support Division.

Naval career
Born in Newcastle, New South Wales, Kafer was admitted to the Royal Australian Naval College, Jervis Bay as a cadet midshipman in 1977. As such, he served primarily aboard the survey ships Flinders and Moresby.

Returning to Australia in 1992, he took up command of HMAS Flinders, and in 1994 was appointed as a Director of the RAN Staff College. After another period as a Hydrographic Officer, in 1997 he took command of  upon its commission into the RAN. Late in 2000, he returned to the Australian Hydrographic Office to begin a four-year appointment as Commander of the RAN Hydrographic, Meteorological and Oceanographic Force Element Group.

He later served as Chief of the Combat Support Group at RAN Headquarters and then returned to Iraq to begin an appointment as Commander Task Forces 152 and 158, coalition maritime task forces which were responsible for security and interception operations in the Gulf.

In December 2009 Kafer assumed duties as Commandant of the Australian Defence Force Academy. He held the post until December 2013, when he was replaced by Air Commodore Alan Clements. He has since served as Director-General of the Australian Navy Cadets & Reserves.

Kafer was promoted to rear admiral in December 2016 and appointed as Head of the Cadet, Reserve and Employer Support Division.

Personal life
Kafer and his wife, Geraldine, have two adult sons.

References

External links
 ADFA Leaders page entry
 Australian Department of Defence biography

|-

|-

1959 births
Military personnel from New South Wales
Australian military personnel of the Iraq War
Australian military personnel of the War in Afghanistan (2001–2021)
Graduates of the Royal Australian Naval College
Living people
Members of the Order of Australia
Recipients of the Conspicuous Service Cross (Australia)
Royal Australian Navy officers